Sachsenhausen may refer to several places in Germany:

 Sachsenhausen (Frankfurt am Main), a city district of Frankfurt am Main, Hesse
 Sachsenhausen (Oranienburg), a city district of Oranienburg, Brandenburg
 Sachsenhausen concentration camp, a detention and extermination facility (1936–1945) in Oranienburg, Brandenburg
 Sachsenhausen (Thuringia), a municipality in the Weimarer Land, Thuringia
 Sachsenhausen (Waldeck), a city district of Waldeck, Hesse

Sachsenhausen may also refer to:

 Sachsenhausen, the German name for Săsăuş village, Chirpăr Commune, Sibiu County, Romania